Albert Kwame Mensah Abotsi (born 20 June 1981) is a Ghanaian male weightlifter, competing in the 105 kg category and representing Ghana at international competitions. He competed at world championships, most recently at the 2009 World Weightlifting Championships.

Major results

References

External links 
 

1981 births
Living people
Ghanaian male weightlifters
Place of birth missing (living people)
Weightlifters at the 2010 Commonwealth Games
Commonwealth Games competitors for Ghana